Michaël Jérémiasz (born 15 October 1981, in Paris) is a French former professional wheelchair tennis player. He won a gold medal in the men's doubles event at the 2008 Beijing Paralympics, and has completed the career Super Slam in doubles. Jérémiasz has been ranked world No. 1 in both doubles and singles. He is right-handed and likes hard courts. He was coached by Jerome Delbert.

Grand Slam titles

Doubles
 2003 Australian Open (w/Hall)
 2005 US Open (w/Ammerlaan)
 2006 US Open (w/Ammerlaan)
 2009 French Open (w/Houdet)
 2009 Wimbledon Championships (w/Houdet)
 2012 Wimbledon Championships (w/Egberink)

Performance timelines

Wheelchair singles

Wheelchair doubles

References

External links
 
 
 

1981 births
Living people
French male tennis players
Wheelchair tennis players
Paralympic wheelchair tennis players of France
Paralympic gold medalists for France
Paralympic silver medalists for France
Paralympic bronze medalists for France
Medalists at the 2004 Summer Paralympics
Medalists at the 2008 Summer Paralympics
Medalists at the 2012 Summer Paralympics
Wheelchair tennis players at the 2004 Summer Paralympics
Wheelchair tennis players at the 2008 Summer Paralympics
Wheelchair tennis players at the 2012 Summer Paralympics
Wheelchair tennis players at the 2016 Summer Paralympics
Australian Open (tennis) champions
French Open champions
US Open (tennis) champions
Tennis players from Paris
Paralympic medalists in wheelchair tennis
ITF World Champions
21st-century French people